Khiew Hoe Yean is a Malaysian swimmer. He got his first gold medal for Malaysia in Swimming at the 2021 Southeast Asian Games in the 200 m freestyle event. At the 2022 World Aquatics Championships, he broke the national record in the 400 m freestyle event.

References 

Living people
Malaysian people of Chinese descent
Malaysian male freestyle swimmers
Southeast Asian Games medalists in swimming
Southeast Asian Games gold medalists for Malaysia
Southeast Asian Games silver medalists for Malaysia
Southeast Asian Games bronze medalists for Malaysia
Competitors at the 2019 Southeast Asian Games
Competitors at the 2021 Southeast Asian Games
Year of birth missing (living people)
21st-century Malaysian people
Swimmers at the 2022 Commonwealth Games
Commonwealth Games competitors for Malaysia
Malaysian male backstroke swimmers